Kugaon is a village in the Karmala taluka of Solapur district in Maharashtra state, India.

Kugaon is a village in the Karmala taluka of Solapur district in Maharashtra state, India  In the 33rd chapter of Bhima Mahatmya, Rambhakta Hanuman was born in Kugav village

Demographics
Covering  and comprising 348 households at the time of the 2011 census of India, Kugaon had a population of 1806. There were 948 males and 858 females, with 242 people being aged six or younger.

References

Villages in Karmala taluka